Sergei Sergeevich Sidorsky (tr. Sergey Sergeyevich Sidorskiy; born March 13, 1954) was a Prime Minister of Belarus from 11 July 2004 to 28 December 2010. He was appointed Acting Prime Minister on July 11, 2004 to replace the dismissed Gennady Novitsky, and was confirmed as permanent Prime Minister on December 19, 2004.

Biography
Sergei Sergeevich Sidorsky was born on 13 March 1954 in Homiel. Graduated from school №12 in 1971. In 1976, he graduated from the Belarusian Institute of Railway Engineers (Faculty of Electrical Engineering). He began his working life as an electrical fitter and electrician.

Career outline
1976-91: foreman of assembly shop, head of laboratory, head of department, deputy director at Homiel Radio Equipment Plant
1991-92: director, Homiel Radio Equipment Plant
1992-98: general manager, Research and Production Association RATON, Homiel
1998-2001: deputy chairman, first deputy chairman, Homiel Voblast Administration
2001-02: Deputy Prime Minister of the Republic of Belarus
2002-03: First Deputy Prime Minister, Acting Prime Minister of the Republic of Belarus
December 2003–December 2010: Prime Minister of the Republic of Belarus

Sidorski has the title of Honoured Workman of the Industry of the Republic of Belarus. He is Doctor of Engineering Sciences and academician at the International Engineering Academy. He is an expert in vacuum-plasma technologies and author of more than 40 scientific publications and monographs.

Personal life 
Sidorsky is married and has two daughters. Besides Belarusian, he also speaks Russian and German.

References

External links 

Official CV from the Council of Ministers of Belarus

1954 births
Living people
People from Gomel
Prime Ministers of Belarus
Members of the Board of the Eurasian Economic Commission